Chapare mammarenavirus or Chapare virus is a virus from the family Arenaviridae which causes a hemorrhagic fever in humans known as Chapare hemorrhagic fever. It was first described after an outbreak of a novel zoonotic mammarenavirus infection occurred in the village of Samuzabeti, Chapare Province, Bolivia, in January 2003. A small number of people were infected and one person died.

In 2019, nine people became infected with the virus in the La Paz regional area, four of whom died. Nosocomial and human-to-human transmission of the virus occurred in at least three of the cases which resulted in the death of a medical intern and a gastroenterologist. Like other members of the Arenavirus family, the specific zoonotic reservoir and primary transmission vector is suspected to be a rodent, probably the small-eared pygmy rice rat.

Virology
The Chapare virus is an enveloped virus with a bi-segmented single-stranded ambisense RNA genome. The two RNA segments are denoted Small (S) and Large (L). It belongs to the New World Clade B lineage of mammarenaviruses and is most closely related to the Sabia virus.

Symptoms
After an incubation period of around 9–19 days, initial symptoms include fever, malaise, headache, myalgia, back pain, dizziness, nausea, vomiting and diarrhoea. The disease often progresses to include hemorrhagic and neurological symptoms, such as gingival hemorrhage, anaemia, leukopaenia, confusion, seizures, echymoses, bleeding from mucous membranes, hemorrhagic shock and multi-organ failure.

Chapare virus RNA was detected in the blood, urine, conjunctiva, semen and in broncho-alveolar and nasopharyngeal samples of the infected patients. Those who survived often had prolonged residual neurological symptoms. Viral RNA was detected in survivors up to 170 days after infection and infectious Chapare virus was obtained in a semen sample of one patient 86 days after symptom onset.

Treatment
Treatment relies mostly on supportive care and early diagnosis. Specific antiviral therapy for Chapare virus infection has yet to be properly investigated.

References

External links

Hemorrhagic fevers
Arenaviridae